Mississippi Power (NYSE: MPJ) is an investor-owned electric utility and a wholly owned subsidiary of Atlanta-based Southern Company. Mississippi Power Company (MPC) is headquartered in Gulfport, Mississippi.

Mississippi Power has 1,253 employees and serves most of the cities, towns, and communities within the 23 counties of southeast Mississippi. The utility also serves six Rural Electrification Administration-financed electric cooperatives: Coast EPA (Electric Power Association), Singing River EPA, Southern Pine EPA, Dixie EPA, Pearl River EPA, and East Mississippi EPA - and one municipality, City of Collins, with wholesale electric power which, in turn, they resell to customers in southeast Mississippi. Based on public data from the U.S. Energy Information Administration, Mississippi Power's 2018 price of electricity to retail customers averaged 8.99 cents, compared to a national average of 10.58 cents.

History

Mississippi Power Company was founded in 1925. In 1949, Southern Company was established as a holding company for four utilities, one of which included Mississippi Power Company.

Formerly known as Mississippi Power Company from 1925 to 1976, the company shortened to Mississippi Power, and has maintained that name ever since.

Hurricane Katrina

August 29, 2005, Hurricane Katrina struck, taking down the company's electric systems and leaving every single customer without service. With a team of 12,000 - employees and crews from every state and Canada - they were able to restore service to all who could receive it in only 12 days. The severity of the storm has cautioned Mississippi Power with every future investment it has made. Most noticeably is the location of the Kemper Project, which was purposefully selected to be comfortably located miles from the Gulf.  It is no wonder that the Kemper Project, officially named Plant Ratcliffe, was named after the 2005 Southern Company CEO, David Ratcliffe.

in 2007, Mississippi Power teamed with the Mississippi Department of Wildlife and Fisheries to begin restocking the Pascagoula River after Hurricane Katrina's massive fish kill by releasing more than 2,500 largemouth bass advanced fingerlings.

Generating plants

Steam plants

Combustion turbines

Fuels used to generate electricity

Transmission and distribution facilities
Mississippi Power maintains 147 substations, 2,118 miles of transmission lines, 4,213 miles of primary overhead lines and 560 miles of primary underground lines. Total generating capacity is 3,098,692 kW.

Kemper Project
Mississippi Power is currently constructing the Kemper County energy facility, commonly shortened to the Kemper Project, in Kemper County, Mississippi. Construction began in June 2010. The Kemper Project was intended to use an integrated gasification combined cycle (IGCC) to convert lignite coal to gas. Lignite, an abundant natural resource in Mississippi and commonly referred to as "brown coal", is very low grade coal. To meet increasing energy demands, Mississippi Power and the Department of Energy invested in technology to turn lignite coal into a viable energy source.  The Kemper Project hoped to capture 65% of the carbon dioxide emissions, a byproduct of the chemical gasification process.  This technology is called Carbon Capture & Sequestration (CCS).

The Kemper Coal Plant was built by Mississippi Power in order to diverse its energy portfolio. With the majority of its investments in natural gas (a fuel with high price volatility), they determined lignite would be a better long-term fuel source than natural gas.

The plant missed all its targets and plans for "clean coal" generation were abandoned in July 2017. The plant is expected to go ahead burning natural gas only.

Mississippi Power Supreme Court Ruling
In February 2015, the Supreme Court of Mississippi found the agreement to raise rates during construction of the plant between the Mississippi Public Service Commission (MPSC) and Mississippi Power to be unlawful. The Court cited the MPSC's failure to give proper notice to the public about the rate increase as one of the main reasons for the 5–4 ruling.  Mississippi Power disagrees with the ruling, and officially announced it plans to file for a rehearing.  The original basis for the agreement between MPSC and Mississippi Power in March 2013 was a result of powers granted in the state's 2008 Baseload Act. This act allows public utilities to collect Construction Work in Progress (CWIP) funds to encourage long term investments by public utility companies.

Additional names for Kemper Project
Plant Ratcliffe
Kemper Coal Project
Kemper County energy facility
Kemper IGCC Plant
Kemper CCS
Kemper Plant
Kemper Power Plant

Notes

External links
 
 Siemens.com: "Siemens provides combined cycle gas turbines for a Mississippi Project in Liberty"

Electric power companies of the United States
Southern Company
Energy infrastructure in Mississippi
Companies based in Mississippi
American companies established in 1925
Energy companies established in 1925
Non-renewable resource companies established in 1925
1920s establishments in Mississippi